George Cohen (1939–2022), England international footballer.

George Cohen may also refer to:

 George Cohen (artist) (1919–1999), American painter and art professor
 George Getzel Cohen (born 1927), South African physician and politician
 George H. Cohen, director of the Federal Mediation and Conciliation Service in the United States
 George Cohen, Sons and Company, a scrap metal merchant in London

See also
 George M. Cohan (1878–1942), American entertainer, actor, singer and dancer

Cohen, George